Kylian Kaïboué (born 20 August 1998) is a French professional footballer who plays for Ligue 2 club Bastia. He can play as a defender and midfielder.

Personal life 
Born in France, Kaïboué is of Algerian descent.

Honours 
Montpellier U19
 Coupe Gambardella: 2016–17

Montpellier B
 Championnat National 3: 2018–19

References 

1998 births
Living people
Sportspeople from Loire (department)
French footballers
Association football defenders
Association football midfielders
French sportspeople of Algerian descent
Montpellier HSC players
FC Sète 34 players
SC Bastia players
Championnat National 3 players
Championnat National 2 players
Championnat National players
Ligue 2 players
Footballers from Auvergne-Rhône-Alpes